The Audie Award for Literary Fiction or Classics is one of the Audie Awards presented annually by the Audio Publishers Association (APA). It awards excellence in narration, production, and content for an audiobook adaptation released in a given year of a work of literary fiction or a classic. Before 2016 this was given as two distinct awards, the Audie Award for Classics (awarded since 2001, before 2003 as the Audie Award for Classics, Fiction) and the Audie Award for Literary Fiction (awarded since 2005).

Literary fiction or classics winners and finalists

2010s

2020s

Classics winners and finalists 2001–2015

2000s

2010s

Literary fiction winners and finalists 2005–2015

2000s

2010s

References

External links 

 Audie Award winners
 Audie Awards official website

Literary Fiction or Classics
Awards established in 2001
English-language literary awards